Statistics of Lebanese Premier League for the 1998–99 season.

Overview
Al-Ansar won the championship.

League standings

References
RSSSF

Leb
1998–99 in Lebanese football
Lebanese Premier League seasons
1998–99 Lebanese Premier League